Siah Bil Khushaber (also Romanized as Sīāh Bīl Khūshāber; also known as Sīāh Bīl Maḩalleh and Sīāhbīl) is a village in Khoshabar Rural District, in the Central District of Rezvanshahr County, Gilan Province, Iran. At the 2006 census, its population was 444, in 120 families.

References 

Populated places in Rezvanshahr County